Triuridopsis is a genus of parasitic flowering plants in the family Triuridaceae. It has two known species, both native to western South America.

Triuridopsis intermedia T.Franke, Beenken & C.Hahn - Bolivia
Triuridopsis peruviana H.Maas & Maas  - Peru

References

External links
Phytoimages, Triuridopsis peruviana

Pandanales genera
Parasitic plants
Triuridaceae